2,6-Naphthalenedicarboxylic acid is an organic compound with the formula C10H6(CO2H)2.  This colorless solid is one of several isomers of naphthalenedicarboxylic acid.  It is a precursor to the high performance polyester polyethylene naphthalate (PEN, poly(ethylene-2,6-naphthalene dicarboxylate)).  It is also used in the synthesis of some metal-organic frameworks.

Preparation
The conjugate base of 2,6-naphthalenedicarboxylic acid, when heated, isomerizes to the 1,6-isomer, which is readily converted to 1,6-naphthalenedicarboxylic acid.  It is also produced by oxidation of 2,6-diisopropylnaphthalene.

References

Dicarboxylic acids
Naphthalenes